Deshraj Patairiya was an Indian folk singer from Bundelkhand. He is credited for popularizing Bundeli folk music across the country and internationally.

Early life 
Patairiya was born in Tindani in the Chhatarpur district in the Indian state of Madhya Pradesh, on 25 July 1953. After graduating from high school, he earned a diploma in music. He was posted in the health department and performed songs at evening parties.

Career 
In 1972 he was a stage performer and started singing for Chhatarpur Akashvani Kendra. During the 1980s, when cassettes of folk music arrived on the market, Patairiya became a folk singer.

Death  
Deshraj Patairiya died on September 5, 2020 at the age of 67. He reportedly died of a heart attack. He is credited with composing a record 10,000 folk songs across five decades.

Discography

Reference

External links 
 Deshraj Patairiya on Gaana

1953 births
2020 deaths
Indian male folk singers
Indian folk singers
People from Chhatarpur district
Indian male singers